Jan Bojer (born June 25, 1989) is a Czech professional ice hockey player. He played with HC Litvínov in the Czech Extraliga during the 2010–11 Czech Extraliga season.

References

External links

1989 births
Czech ice hockey forwards
HC Litvínov players
Living people
HC Most players
HC Stadion Litoměřice players
Czech expatriate ice hockey players in Germany